Asankrangwa Senior High Technical School (also known as ASECTECH) is a second cycle institution located in Asankragua in the Wassa Amenfi West District in the Western Region of Ghana. The school is located along the Enchi Road.

History 
The school was established in 1991.

References 

High schools in Ghana
1991 establishments in Ghana